Feyzabad (also Romanized as Feyẕābād; also known as Feyẕābād-e Soflá and Fūz) is a village in Ravar Rural District, in the Central District of Ravar County, Kerman Province, Iran. At the 2006 census, its population was 1,060, in 287 families.

References 

Populated places in Ravar County